The Hawkeye Open was a golf tournament on the Nike Tour. It ran from 1991 to 1993. It was played at Finkbine Golf Course in Iowa City, Iowa.

In 1993 the winner earned $27,000.

Winners

Notes

Former Korn Ferry Tour events
Golf in Iowa
Recurring sporting events established in 1991
Recurring sporting events disestablished in 1993